Nepal participated in the 15th Asian Games, officially known as the XV Asiad held in Doha from December 1 to December 15, 2006. Nepal ranked 35th with 3 bronze medals in this edition of the Asiad.

Medalists

References

Nations at the 2006 Asian Games
2006
Asian Games